Safia Minney MBE FRSA, is a British social entrepreneur and author. She was the founder of Global Village which she set up in 1991, and the founder and former Global CEO of 24 years of People Tree, a pioneering sustainable and Fair Trade fashion label. She is also a spokesperson and campaigner on Fair Trade and ethical fashion. She initiated World Fair Trade Day in 1999 which is endorsed by the World Fair Trade Organization and their members and celebrated on the second Saturday of May each year. Additionally, she wrote the books Naked Fashion: the New Sustainable Fashion Revolution, Slow Fashion, Aesthetics Meets Ethics and Slave to Fashion.

Career

Early career

Minney started her career in marketing and publishing. She worked for Creative Review magazine for four years and created her own social marketing consultancy working with New Statesman and Friends of the Earth.

In 1990, Minney moved to Tokyo with her husband where she learnt Japanese before working for a publishing company, Amnesty International, and the Body Shop

Global Village

In 1991, Minney founded Global Village, a non-governmental trading organization in Japan.  She began working with two students from Yokohama University, initially publishing a free leaflet that provided consumers with environmental and organic information and listings, and later also selling fair trade products.

People Tree

In 1995 Fair Trade Company was formed as a limited company in Japan by transferring the fair trading activity of Global Village. A shop was opened in the Jiyugaoka district of Tokyo and in 1996 the business became a member of the World Fair Trade Organization.

In 2000 'People Tree' was launched by Fair Trade Company in London to establish fair trade fashion in Europe

In 2014 People Tree became the first company to be awarded the World Fair Trade Organisation Fair Trade product label with an international sales turnover of £8m. WFTO labelling is intended to guarantees People Tree’s compliance to the Principles of Fair Trade, covering fair wages, working conditions, transparency, capacity building, environmental best practice, gender equality and setting standards for conventional fashion companies to improve their supply chains. People Tree launched the first clothing range to meet the Global Organic Textile Standard certified by the Soil Association in the developing world.

During her time at People Tree, Minney worked with many designers, celebrities and influencers, including Emma Watson,  Dame Zandra Rhodes, and Bora Aksu

Recent Work 
Minney left People Tree as Global CEO at the end of 2015 to pursue new projects, including a time as MD of ethical Shoe brand Pozu.

In 2019 she started a Community Interest Company called Real Sustainability that "aims to support citizens and organisational leaders to transition to carbon zero and sustainability".

In 2022 she launched Fashion Declares, a grassroots campaign to encourage people at all levels within the fashion industry to tackle the current "climate, ecological and social emergency” associated with climate change.

Awards 

 P.E.A. Awards, Green Pioneer, 2021
 Woman’s Hour Top 30 Women in Sustainability, 2020

 Ranked #9 in UK100 Corporate Modern Slavery Influencers’ Index, 2018

 People Tree Highly Commended in the Sustainable Fashion category at London Sustainable City Awards, 2012

 High Street Fashion Week Awards – Eco Warrior Award, 2010

 WGSN Global Fashion Awards – Most Sustainable Brand, 2010

 MBE for services to the Fashion industry and Fair Trade industry, 2009

 The Observer Ethical Awards – Fashion, 2009

 Finalist in the Triodos Bank Women in Ethical Business Awards, 2008
 Social Entrepreneur of the Year in the Edge Upstart Awards in Britain, 2006

 Selected as one of the world’s most ‘Outstanding Social Entrepreneurs’ by the Schwab Foundation for Social Entrepreneurship, World Economic Forum, 2005

Personal life

Minney was born in Britain in 1964 to a Swiss mother and Mauritian father.

See also
Ethical consumerism
Fair trade
Social entrepreneur
World Fair Trade Organization
Social enterprise

References

English businesspeople in fashion
English people of Mauritian descent
English people of Swiss descent
Members of the Order of the British Empire
1964 births
Living people